A by-election was held for the New South Wales Legislative Assembly electorate of East Sydney on 12 June 1872 because Saul Samuel resigned to accept an appointment to the Legislative Council.

Dates

Result

Saul Samuel resigned to accept an appointment to the Legislative Council.

See also
Electoral results for the district of East Sydney
List of New South Wales state by-elections

References

1872 elections in Australia
New South Wales state by-elections
1870s in New South Wales